The Western Star was a named passenger train operated by the Great Northern Railway between Chicago and the Pacific Northwest via  Minneapolis/St. Paul, Minnesota. Between Chicago and St. Paul the train used the route of the Chicago, Burlington and Quincy Railroad; in later years eastbound passengers were accommodated on Burlington trains east of St. Paul. Through cars from the train operated between Spokane, Washington and Portland, Oregon via the Spokane, Portland and Seattle Railway. It operated from 1951 to 1971.

History
The Western Star was inaugurated on June 3, 1951, replacing the Oriental Limited as the secondary train along the Great Northern's transcontinental route. The Great Northern's primary train was the famed Empire Builder, which made the run in 45 hours. The Western Star required a more leisurely 58 hours, making more intermediate stops and serving branches the Empire Builder bypassed, such as Grand Forks, North Dakota and Great Falls, Montana. The Star used equipment from the Empire Builder, which had been completely reequipped.

Amtrak did not retain the Western Star as part of its national route network and the train was discontinued on May 1, 1971, although it did re-route the Empire Builder to serve Grand Forks.

Equipment
The 1951 Western Star required six sets of equipment to operate; it inherited five of these from the faster Empire Builder. Each set of equipment consisted of fourteen cars:

Each set could carry 330 passengers.

References

External links
 1966 timetable

Passenger trains of the Great Northern Railway (U.S.)
Named passenger trains of the United States
Railway services introduced in 1951
Railway services discontinued in 1971